Pleasant Grove is an unincorporated community in Belmont County, in the U.S. state of Ohio.

History
The first settlement at Pleasant Grove was made in 1825. The community was descriptively named. A post office called Plank Road was established in 1854, the name was changed to Pleasant Grove in 1871, and the post office closed in 1909.

References

Unincorporated communities in Belmont County, Ohio
1825 establishments in Ohio
Populated places established in 1825
Unincorporated communities in Ohio